Mikaela Krantz is an American actress, known for her voice acting in anime dubs for Funimation, and her live action role as young Hillary Clinton in Hillary's America: The Secret History of the Democratic Party.

Personal life
Krantz is autistic.

Filmography

Anime series
{| class="wikitable sortable plainrowheaders"
|+ List of voice performances in anime series
! Year
! Title
! Role
! class="unsortable" | Notes
! class="unsortable" | 
|-
|rowspan="4"|2015
|Ultimate Otaku Teacher
|Suzune Kagami
|Lead role
|
|-
|Shomin Sample
|Reiko Arisugawa
|Main role
|
|-
|Riddle Story of Devil
|Mahiru Banba, Shinya Banba
|
|
|-
|Fairy Tail
|Beth Vanderwood
|
|
|-
|rowspan="9"|2016
|Snow White with the Red Hair
|Ryu
|
|
|-
|Divine Gate
|K
|
|
|-
|Black Butler: Book of Circus
|Doll
|
|
|-
|Gonna be the Twin-Tail!!
|Erina, Tail Yellow
|Main role
|
|-
|Shimoneta
|Hyoka
|
|
|-
|Overlord (season 1)
|Clementine
|
|
|-
|Show By Rock!! 2
|Rosia
|Also Show By Rock!! Short!!
|
|-
|Drifters
|masha
|
|
|-
|Keijo!!!!!!!!
|Maya Sakashiro
|
|
|-
|rowspan="16"|2017
|Garo: Crimson Moon
|Kintoki
|
|
|-
|Masamune-kun's Revenge
|Momo
|
|
|-
|Interviews with Monster Girls
|Kurtz
|
|
|-
|ACCA: 13-Territory Inspection Dept.
|Carmin
|
|
|-
|Yamada-kun and the Seven Witches
|Urara Shiraishi
|Lead role
|
|-
|Brave Witches
|Pilot Officer Naoe Kanno
|
|
|-
|Kado: The Right Answer
|Saraka Tsukai
|
|
|-
|Tsugumomo
|Nanako
|
|
|-
|Restaurant to Another World
|Arius
|
|
|-
|Hina Logic - from Luck & Logic
|Yayoi
|
|
|-
|Chronos Ruler
|Emily
|
|
|-
|Tsuredure Children
|Chiyo Kurihara
|
|
|-
|The Ancient Magus' Bride
|Gwee
|
|
|-
|King's Game The Animation
|Ria
|
|
|-
|Star Blazers: Space Battleship Yamato 2199
|Kaoru Niimi
|
|
|-
|Hundred
|Emile Crossfode
|Lead role
|
|-
|rowspan="14"|2018
|Cardcaptor Sakura: Clear Card
|Kero
|
|
|-
|Tokyo Ghoul:re
|Tōru Mutsuki
|Also Season 2|
|-
|Aokana: Four Rhythm Across the Blue|Minamo
|
|
|-
|High School DxD Hero|Millicas Gremory
|
|
|-
|Steins;Gate 0 (TV series)|Fubuki
|
|
|-
|Hanebado!|Kaoruko
|
|
|-
|Chio's School Road|Chio
|Lead role
|
|-
|Angels of Death|Zack (young)
|
|
|-
|Magical Girl Raising Project|Calamity Mary
|
|
|-
|Kakuriyo: Bed and Breakfast for Spirits|Mei
|
|
|-
|Conception|Virgo
|
|
|-
|RErideD – Derrida, who leaps through time –|Derrida (young)
|
|
|-
|Ace Attorney (season 2)|Napalm
|
|
|-
|That Time I Got Reincarnated as a Slime|Gobtsu
|
|
|-
|rowspan="2"|2019
|Fruits Basket (2019 TV series)|Momiji Soma
|
|
|-
|Dr. Stone|Senku Ishigami (young)
|
|
|-
|rowspan="1"|2020
|Listeners|Ein
|
|
|-
|rowspan="1"|2021
|Wonder Egg Priority|Ai
|Lead role
|
|-
|}

Live-action
 Hillary's America: The Secret History of the Democratic Party'' (2016), young Hillary Clinton

Awards

References

External links
 

Living people
21st-century American actresses
American video game actresses
American voice actresses
Year of birth missing (living people)
People on the autism spectrum